Mattia Gennari (born 18 December 1991) is an Italian professional footballer who plays as a centre back for  club Montevarchi.

Club career
Born in Città di Castello, Gennari started his career in Serie D club Sansepolcro.

In 2018 he returned to Vis Pesaro. After four season in Vis Pesaro, on 25 August 2021 he left the club. Gennari played 112 matches and was the captain.

On 31 January 2022, he signed with Montevarchi on Serie C.

References

External links
 
 

1991 births
Living people
People from Città di Castello
Footballers from Umbria
Sportspeople from the Province of Perugia
Italian footballers
Association football central defenders
Serie C players
Lega Pro Seconda Divisione players
Serie D players
A.S. Melfi players
S.F. Aversa Normanna players
A.S.D. Città di Foligno 1928 players
Vis Pesaro dal 1898 players
Fermana F.C. players
U.S. Pistoiese 1921 players
Montevarchi Calcio Aquila 1902 players